John Comer (1 March 1924 – 11 February 1984) was a British comic actor. He was best known for his roles in Coronation Street as Mr Birtles, then as a taxi driver, and later as Wilf Jones, in Emmerdale Farm as Ernie Shuttleworth, Les Brandon in I Didn't Know You Cared, and cafe owner Sid in Last of the Summer Wine.

Early life
Born and brought up in Stretford, Lancashire, Comer gained an engineering apprenticeship at Metropolitan-Vickers, Trafford Park.

Early career

Comer began his career performing a comedy routine around local social clubs and pubs in the 1930s and 1940s. In 1952, with his younger brother Tony, he performed in a children's theatre production for local schools in Stretford. The siblings then formed a double act named the Comer Brothers. In 1957, the brothers began a regular slot at the Manchester Apollo, performing a variety act entitled Comer's Cottage.

In 1958, the Comer Brothers participated in an ITV talent show called Bid for Fame and began working for Butlin's. In 1959, they won first prize in the Butlin's National Talent Contest, winning £1,000 and a film contract with the Boulting Brothers.

Success

In 1959, the Boulting brothers cast John and Tony Comer in the film I'm All Right Jack, in which they starred alongside Peter Sellers and Richard Attenborough as trade union shop stewards. Their next film roles were in 1961, when they featured alongside Rita Tushingham in A Taste of Honey. However, shortly afterwards Tony decided to leave showbusiness and returned to full-time work at Metropolitan-Vickers, while John decided to continue pursuing his film career. He appeared in the Boulting Brothers' 1967 film The Family Way as a father-of-the-bride to Hayley Mills's character, whose father John Mills portrayed her father-in-law.

He gained a recurring role in 1973 as the primary supporting role of Sid in the new BBC sitcom Last of the Summer Wine. He also starred in a long-running advertising campaign for Home Brew Beer. In 1977, he appeared as Bill Malley in the BBC series Murder Most English. Comer appeared in an episode of All Creatures Great and Small entitled "The Name of the Game" in 1978.

Death
Comer died of throat cancer in 1984, at the age of 59. The disease had so affected his voice that in his final television appearance, as cafe owner Sid, in the Last of the Summer Wine Christmas episode Getting Sam Home, his lines had to be dubbed by another actor, Tony Melody. His funeral was held at Carleton Crematorium, Blackpool, where he is commemorated at rose-bed no. 18. After the death of Comer's wife, Mollie, in 2010, his estate was finalised; in 2013 the Comer family donated £245,000 to the hospice in Blackpool where John Comer was treated before his death.

Film roles

Television roles

References

External links

 John Comer at the BBC Comedy Guide

1924 births
1984 deaths
English male television actors
20th-century English male actors
British male comedy actors
Male actors from Manchester
People from Stretford
Metropolitan-Vickers people
Bevin Boys
Deaths from cancer in England
Deaths from esophageal cancer